"After the Storm" is a song by American singer Kali Uchis featuring American rapper Tyler, the Creator and fellow American singer Bootsy Collins. It was released on January 12, 2018, by Virgin EMI Records and Interscope Records, as the third single from Uchis' debut studio album, Isolation.  It was written by the artists alongside production team BadBadNotGood, while the song's official remix is produced by Pete Rock.

Background and release
On February 3, 2015, Uchis stated in an interview with Billboard that she wanted to work with Bootsy Collins, "I followed him on Twitter and he still hasn't followed me back, so I'm just waiting for him to follow me". Bootsy Collins responded to Kali Uchis' interview days after the publication via Twitter. Both Uchis and Collins worked on music in Collins' ranch in Ohio.

Uchis appears on Collins' song "Worth My While" from his album World Wide Funk, released in October 2017.

The single was released for digital download on January 12, 2018.

Music video
The song's music video, directed by Nadia Lee Cohen, was released on January 25, 2018. The video features scenes with Tyler, the Creator as a plant, and Bootsy Collins in animated form.

In a review of Uchis' video, The Verge's Kaitlyn Tiffany describes the video as a "radically lemon-yellow ensemble". Vogue writer Rachel Hahn describes Uchis' outfit as a "bright blue lounge set fit for a '50s housewife".

Live performances
On March 15, 2018, Kali Uchis performed "After the Storm" with Tyler, the Creator and The Roots for her television debut on The Tonight Show. On April 15, 2018, Uchis performed the song during her set at Coachella with Tyler, the Creator.

Credits and personnel
Credits adapted from Tidal and the Isolation album liner notes.

 Mixed and mastered at Bedrock.LA (Los Angeles, California)

Personnel

Kali Uchis – lead vocals, background vocals, songwriting
Tyler, The Creator – vocals, songwriting
Bootsy Collins – vocals, songwriting, bass guitar
Matthew Tavares – songwriting,  fender rhodes
Chester Hansen – songwriting, bass guitar, synthesizer
Leland Whitty – songwriting, guitar
Alexander Sowinski – songwriting, percussion, drums
BadBadNotGood – production
Pete Rock - remix production

Jeff Ellis – mixing
CHiCO TORRES – mixing assistance
Timothy Nguyen – mixing assistance
Vic Wainstein – engineering
Dave Kutch – mastering

Charts

Certifications

References

2018 singles
2018 songs
Kali Uchis songs
Bootsy Collins songs
Songs written by Bootsy Collins
Songs written by Chester Hansen
Songs written by Kali Uchis
Songs written by Matthew Tavares
Songs written by Tyler, the Creator
Tyler, the Creator songs
Virgin EMI Records singles
Neo soul songs
Electronica songs